Sireniki (Yupik: Сиӷинык, literally Mountain of Horns; Chukchi: , Vutèèn; Sirenik: Sigheneg) is a village (selo) in Providensky District of Chukotka Autonomous Okrug, in the Far Eastern Federal District of Russia. Population:  Municipally, Sireniki is subordinated to Providensky/Providenia Municipal District. In 2010, a law was passed abolishing the municipal rural settlement of Sireniki. The village continues to exist, but is now municipally part of Providenia Urban Settlement.

Geography
The placement of the settlement owes much to a sizeable polynya at the shore of the village, allowing the inhabitants to hunt all year round. The village is situated north of Cape Stoletiya and Southeast of Cape Zelyony on the coast where the Maingyvykvyn, Sirenik-Keivuk and Sineveyem empty into the sea. There are numerous high cliffs surrounding the village, some of which have been named by the local people with poetic names such as "Sokol" (falcon) and "Yablochko" (little apple). Nearby is a marine grotto called "Sochi" after the Black Sea resort, which the villagers use for swimming in the summer.

Wildlife
The existence of the polynya attracts a wide variety of sea life, numerous species of whales and seals inhabit the area, and the village is situated along the main spring migration route of the Bowhead whale, the target of the majority of the Yupik inhabitants hunting. To the east of the village, the Imtuk Lagoon is rich in fish and the inhabitants catch cod during the winter and salmon in the summer. there are also a wide range of different bird species that nest in the high cliffs surrounding the village, including puffins and gulls.

History

Early history
Sireniki is the only historically Yupik settlement in Chukotka, and the village has been established on the same site for 2-2,500 years, and originated because it was situated on the migration route of whales. It is also the only pre-historic village in Chukotka to have been continuously occupied to the present day. There are numerous traces of ancient Yupik settlement in and around the village, however the majority of this is now buried under the village fox farm. There are three separately identified areas of ancient settlement. The oldest of these is called Valvurak, which was inhabited from the 1st century AD until its abandonment in the 19th century. The other two are called Sliygu, a set of three dugout dwellings dating from the Punuk Period and Tykylia, another set of dugout dwellings cut into the side of a volcano and used as habitation from the start of the 19th century to the mid twentieth century. The dwellings in these old part of the village were supported by the bones of the whales that the inhabitants harvested.

The origin of the name of the village is a matter of debate. Some sources state that it means "Mountain of Horns", though others suggest it comes from the words for "Valley of the Sun" or "Wheatgrass".

Recent history
Historically the village has been populated by Yupik, however in the 1960s, following a drive to force the nomadic reindeer-herding Chukchi to live a more settled life, a number who lived in the Kurupkan River valley were moved to the village, though the Yupik of the village still practice traditional marine hunting.

The Sirenik Eskimo language, which some consider as separate from Yupik and Inuit language groups, was spoken by the Sirenik people in the village until 1997, when the last native speaker died.

Municipal reorganisation

On September 10, 2010, a law was passed abolishing Novoye Chaplino and Sireniki at municipal level. Novoye Chaplino as an entity continues to exist, but it is no longer a rural settlement on its own, but simply an inhabited locality within Provideniya urban settlement. The right of the village to local administration was removed and such responsibilities were taken over by Provideniya municipal administration on January 1, 2011. Provideniya municipal administration also took control of all municipal property, all municipal property rights and all local budgets on this date.

Demographics
The population according to the most recent census data is 469, of whom 239 were male and 230 female, a reduction on a 2006 estimate of 533 (although other sources merely state a population over 500). In 2014, the head of the rural settlement was Natalia Protopopova.

Economics
The Yupik population in the village continues traditional sea hunting practices, and preserve traditional methods of construction for boats. In addition there is also a fox farm which, along with sea hunting is the main source of employment in the village. There is also a general store, a school and a library in the village, though following the collapse of the Soviet Union, the school shrunk from a ten-grade school to a six-grade school due to the difficulty in finding suitably qualified teachers.

Transport
The village is a 15-minute flight from Provideniya, although according to a 2006 source, there are no scheduled flights available. Other than approaching the village by sea, the only other route is a 70 km unpaved road across a number of mountain passes.

Climate
The coldest month of the year is January, whilst the warmest is July. On average, the temperature does not rise above freezing between November and April and it snows at least once in every month except July and August.

See also
List of inhabited localities in Providensky District

References

Notes

Sources
 
 
I. Krupnik and N. Vakhtin In the 'House of Dismay': Knowledge, Culture and Post-Soviet Politics in Chukotka, 1995-6  (2002) in People and the Land. Pathways to Reform in Post-Soviet Siberia, ed. E. Kasten

M Strogoff, P-C Brochet, and D. Auzias Petit Futé: Chukotka (2006). "Avant-Garde" Publishing House.

Rural localities in Chukotka Autonomous Okrug
Yupik
Road-inaccessible communities of Russia